The Central Hume Football Association was an Australian Rules Football competition that was first established in 1928 after a meeting comprising the following clubs: Bowna, Burrumbuttock, Gerogery, Jindera and Walbundrie and was based at Jindera in the Riverina area, New South Wales.

History
The Central Hume Football Association was an Australian Rules Football competition that was first established in 1928 after a meeting comprising the following clubs: Bowna, Burrumbuttock, Gerogery, Jindera and Walbundrie.

In 1933, Gerogery, Jindera and Lavington broke away and joined the newly formed Hume Football League, with Gerogery having immediate success, claiming four consecutive Hume Football League premierships from 1933 to 1936.

Bulgandra FC played in the Central Hume FA in 1933 and 1934, which was a small settlement near where gold was discovered at the Walbundrie Reefs in the 1850's.

In 1935, Burrumbuttock, Walbundrie and Walla Walla joined the Hume Football League, while Brocklesby joined the Albury & District Football League and Rand joined the Coreen & District Football League.

The Central Hume FA held a meeting in March, 1935, with three clubs - Bulgandra, Rand and Walbundrie keen to play, but it appears the competition did not reform at the scheduled May, 1935 meeting after a number of former club's joined the Hume Football League during the presiding two years.

All up there were eleven club's that played in the Central Hume FA during its short, seven year history.

Hume Football Association - 1922 to 1926.
There was an original Hume Football Association that was formed in 1922 and ran from 1922 to 1926 during its short history.
Premiers / Runners Up
1922 - Bulgandra: 8.12 - 60 defeated Walla Walla: 6.4 - 40. Other teams were - Brocklesby, Burrumbuttock and Walbundrie.
1923 - Burrumbuttock: 6.8 - 38 d Brocklesby: 6.5 - 35. Other teams were - Bulgandra, Walbundrie and Walla Walla. Brocklesby & Walla Walla joined the Riverina Football Association in 1924. 
1924 - Bulgandra d Burrumbuttock. Other teams were - Walbundrie and Walla Walla Sub Division (Ramblers). The Walla Walla Subdivision FC joined the Riverina Football Association in 1925. Burrumbuttock joined the Albury B. Grade Football Association in 1925.
1925 - The Hume FA had an AGM in March, 1925 with three club's, Bulgandra, Rand and Walbundrie interested in playing, but it appears the Hume FA went into recess in 1925.
1926 - Rand: 10.3 - 64 d Bulgandra: 4.6 - 30. Other teams were - Burrumbuttock and Walbundrie. Burrumbuttock joined the Albury & Border FA & Rand joined the Osborne FA in 1927, while Bulgandra and Walbundrie were forced to go into recess for 1927, as Walbundrie were refused entry into the Albury & Border FA. Bulgandra and Walbundrie then joined the Central Hume FA in 1928.

Former Central Hume FA Clubs
The following clubs played in the Central Hume FA -
Bowna: 1928. Club folded in 1929.
Brocklesby: 1933 & 1934. Joined the Albury & District Football League in 1935.
Bulgandra: 1933 & 1934. Club folded in 1935.
Burrumbuttock: 1928 to 1934. Joined the Hume Football League in 1935.
Grerogery: 1928 to 1932. Joined the Hume Football League in 1933.
Jindera: 1928 to 1932. Joined the Hume Football League in 1933.
Lavington: 1929 to 1932. Joined the Hume Football League in 1933.
Mullengandra: 1929 to 1931. Club folded.
Rand: 1932 to 1934. Rand joined the Coreen & District Football League in 1935. 
Walbundrie: 1928 to 1934. Joined the Hume Football League in 1935.
Walla Walla: 1930 to 1934. Joined the Hume Football League in 1935.

Central Hume FA: Premiers / Runners Up
1928 - Burrumbuttock: 9.11 - 65 d Jindera: 5.15 - 45. Played at Jindera.
1929 - Jindera: 11.5 - 71 d Gerogery: 8.5 - 53 
1930 - Gerogery: 6.8 - 44 d Jindera: 3.9 - 27 
1931 - Walla Walla: 16.12 - 108 d Burrumbuttock: 13.12 - 90. Played at Jindera.
1932 - Burrumbuttock d Rand. Played at Walla Walla.
1933 - Rand: 10.9 - 69 d Burrumbuttock: 8.8 - 56. Played at Walbundrie.
1934 - Rand: 5.13 - 43 d Bulgandra: 5.8 - 38. Played at Walbundrie.

Central Hume FA: Office Bearers

Links
Hume FNL website

References

Australian rules football competitions
Defunct Australian rules football competitions in New South Wales
Sport in the Riverina
Sports leagues established in 1928
1928 establishments in Australia